Saint Daniel may refer to:

 Daniel (biblical figure), biblical prophet, feast day July 21 (Roman Catholic) or December 17 (Eastern Orthodox)
 Daniel of Padua (died 168), Italian martyr, feast day January 3
 Daniel of Daniel and Verda (died 344), Christian martyr in Persia, feast day 21 February
 Daniel the Stylite (409–493), Mesopotamian monk and ascetic, feast day December 11
 Daniel Comboni (1831–1881), Italian Catholic missionary to Africa, feast day October 10

See also
 Antoine Daniel (1601–1648), French Jesuit martyr and missionary to the Hurons, feast days October 19 and September 26